The Paris International Contemporary Art Fair (Foire Internationale d’Art Contemporain or FIAC) is a contemporary art event that occurs in Paris.

History
FIAC was usually held in October in the Grand Palais. In 2019, the fair announced that it would move to a temporary venue on the Champ de Mars, by the Eiffel Tower, for at least two years and to move back to the Grand Palais by 2024. In 2022, however, Art Basel surprisingly evinced FIAC from the Grand Palais.

From 2006 to 2019, as part of the fair’s outdoor program Hors les Murs, well-known venues across the city – the Tuileries Garden, the Musée national Eugène Delacroix, the National Museum of Natural History and Place Vendôme – featured temporary installations of Alexander Calder, George Condo, Thomas Houseago, Robert Indiana, Per Kirkeby, Alicja Kwade, Richard Long and Oscar Tuazon, among others. From 2018, the venues also included Place de la Concorde, with architectural works by Kengo Kuma, Claude Parent and Jean Prouvé, among others.

Milestones
 1974 – The first edition is held in the Gare de la Bastille 
 1975 – The fair moves to the Grand Palais
 1982 – FIAC welcomes photography for the first time 
 2001 – The fair welcomes video art for the first time
 2007 – FIAC and Artprice issue the first Annual Report on the Contemporary Art Market, analyzing the sales of 500 artists
 2011 – FIAC starts to have an outside the walls part, in the Jardin des Plantes and the Jardin des Tuileries
 2014 – In parallel of FIAC, the first Foire OFF(ICIELLE) is launched with 68 emerging galleries at the City of Fashion and DesignScott Reyburn (24 October 2014), Art Fair Crowd Moves Across the Channel New York Times.

 Directors 
 2003–present: Jennifer Flay

 Marcel Duchamp Prize
The Marcel Duchamp Prize (in French : Prix Marcel Duchamp) is an annual award given to a young artist by the Association pour la Diffusion Internationale de l'Art Français (ADIAF) since 2001 at the FIAC. 

The winner receives €35,000 personally and up to €30,000 in order to produce an exhibition of their work in the Modern Art museum (Centre Georges Pompidou).

 Controversy 
In 2014, a Hors Les Murs feature, the 80-meter-high inflatable sculpture Tree'' by Paul McCarthy in the Place Vendôme was deflated by vandals. McCarthy and local authorities decided not to re-inflate it. The lime green sculpture was described by the artist as a Christmas tree, but critics said it looked like a butt plug.

See also
Art Basel
Frieze Art Fair

References

External links

Contemporary art fairs
Contemporary art awards
October events
1974 establishments in France
Festivals established in 1974